Ibragimotar is a rural locality (a selo) and the administrative center of Gindibsky Selsoviet, Tlyaratinsky District, Republic of Dagestan, Russia. The population was 1,232 as of 2010. There are 14 streets.

Geography 
Ibragimotar is located 289 km north of Tlyarata (the district's administrative centre) by road. Kalininaul is the nearest rural locality.

References 

Rural localities in Tlyaratinsky District